Daucus broteri, commonly known as Brotero's carrot, is a wild relative of Daucus carota that can be found across the northeast Mediterranean and the Middle East. It grows in cultivated and plantation-type land.

Description

Daucus broteri forms disc-shaped bunches of white flowers called Umbels that bloom between April and August. It grows up to 10 to 30 cm with an upright stem that's heavily branched at the base with a single, long taproot and leaves that are bi-pinnate.

References

Daucus
Flora of Europe
Plants described in 1830